Drat may refer to:

A minced oath for "damn"
Drat! The Cat!, a 1965 Broadway musical
Distrito de Riego Arenal-Tempisque (DRAT), see Water resources management in Costa Rica
Deterministic Trim (DRAT), see Trim (computing)

See also 
 Drad (disambiguation)